Mecas albovitticollis is a species of longhorn beetles found in Mexico. It was described by Stephan von Breuning in 1955.

References

Saperdini
Beetles described in 1955